Gods or God, in comics, may refer to:

 New Gods
 Olympian Gods (comics)
 Young Gods (comics)
 God (Image Comics)

See also
Gods (disambiguation)
God (disambiguation)